Novel Romance is a 2006 art-house romantic comedy film directed by Emily Skopov in her feature film directorial debut. It stars Traci Lords, Paul Johansson and Sherilyn Fenn. The film was shot in 2004 in Venice, Los Angeles, California, USA, and premiered on October 8, 2006, at the 2nd Annual LA Femme Film Festival.

Plot summary
The film follows Max Normane, a successful literary editor, who wants to have a child alone. She offers to publish Jake Buckley  (Paul Johansson), a struggling writer, in exchange for his sperm for artificial insemination.

Cast 
 Traci Lords as Max Normane
 Paul Johansson as Jake Buckley
 Sherilyn Fenn as Liza Normane Stewart
 Mariette Hartley as Marty McCall
Jacqueline Piñol as Isabelle
 Mikaila Baumel as Four-Year-Old Emma
 Pia Artesona as Rita Ramirez
 Tony Lee as Todd

Festivals
Novel Romance was selected to screen at the following film festivals:
2006 LA Femme Film Festival (October 8, 2006)
2007 Other Venice Film Festival (March 17, 2007)
2007 Anthology Film Archives New Filmmakers Series (June 27, 2007)

Awards
LA Femme Film Festival
2007: won Honorable Mention for Outstanding Achievement – Emily Skopov

External links 
 Official site
 
 

2006 films
2006 romantic comedy films
Films set in California
Films shot in Venice, Los Angeles
American independent films
American romantic comedy films
2006 independent films
2006 directorial debut films
2000s English-language films
2000s American films